Download is transferring a file to or from another computer.

Download may also refer to:
 Download (band), a band with Cevin Key and Phil Western
 "Download" (song), a 2009 song by rapper Lil' Kim
 Download (TV series), an Australian television series
 Download (game show), a 2000–2002 Australian children's game show for Nine Network
 Download Festival, a British rock festival
 Download.com, the world's largest Internet download directory website
 Download!, a former Nokia application store
 Download The True Story of the Internet, a documentary television series about Internet history
 Downloaded (Battlestar Galactica), a 2006 Battlestar Galactica Season 2 episode
 Downloaded (film), a 2013 documentary film
 Decommissioned highway, when a highway is "downloaded" to a municipality as a local road  
 File sharing, the uploading and downloading of files over a distributed peer network
 Music download, the transferral of music from an Internet-facing computer or website to a user's local desktop computer